Lassoumti is a village in the commune of Mayo-Baléo in the Adamawa Region of Cameroon, near the .

Population 
In 1971, Lassoumti contained 240 inhabitants, mainly Kutin.

At the time of the 2005 census, there were 477 people in the village.

References

Bibliography 
 Jean Boutrais (ed.), Peuples et cultures de l'Adamaoua (Cameroun) : Actes du colloque de Ngaoundéré, du 14 au 16 janvier 1992, ORSTOM, Paris ; Ngaoundéré-Anthropos, 1993, 316 p. 
 Dictionnaire des villages de l'Adamaoua, ONAREST, Yaoundé, October 1974, 133 p.

External links 
 Mayo-Baléo, sur le site Communes et villes unies du Cameroun (CVUC)

Populated places in Adamawa Region